The R416 road, also called the Milltown Road or Athgarvan Road, is a regional road in Ireland, located in County Kildare.

References

Regional roads in the Republic of Ireland
Roads in County Kildare